Mohd Noh Dalimin, BSc (Gadjah Mada University) is a Professor of Physics (Energy and Materials). He is the second Vice-Chancellor of Universiti Tun Hussein Onn Malaysia (UTHM), from October, 2008 until October 2016 replacing Ismail Hj. Bakar. Prior to that, he was the Vice-Chancellor of University Malaysia Sabah (UMS) between 2005 and 2008, and a Deputy Vice-Chancellor between 1998 and 2005, in the same university.

Mohd Noh is married to Maryati Mohamed, an entomologist, and they have seven children.

Career
Mohd Noh started his career as a lecturer in Physics in Universiti Kebangsaan Malaysia in 1981 after completing his studies in Imperial College, London. In 1992, he was appointed as Deputy Dean, Faculty of Science and Natural Resources of the same university, before joining as Foundation Dean and Professor of Physics, School of Science and Technology, Universiti Malaysia Sabah, in 1995.

Education
Mohd Noh received his early education in his home town, Batu Pahat; Primary education in Pintas Raya Primary school, and Limpoon Primary English School, and Secondary education in Sultan Sulaiman English School and High School Batu Pahat. He is a graduate in Physics from Gadjah Mada University, a Master of Science in Solid State Physics from Bedford College, University of London, and has a PhD in experimental Solid State Physics, from Imperial College London.

Contribution
During his student days, Mohd Noh was very active in student movement. He was the President of PKPMI-Persatuan Kebangsaan Pelajar Malaysia di Indonesia, between 1974 and 1975, as well as the President of KMUK- Kesatuan Pelajar Melayu di United Kingdom, between 1977 and 1979. He was also active in various organisations after his coming back to Malaysia in 1981, including as President of Parent Teachers Associations of several schools, Cooperative movement, Community associations and several organisations in Malaysia and abroad.

Mohd Noh was chairman for the Malaysia Section of ISES (International Solar Energy Society) a UN accredited NGO. He is also currently the Chairman of the Malaysian Examinations Syndicate (Majlis Peperiksaan Malaysia) as well as the National Chairman of the Malaysian Technical University Networks (MTUN).

Expert area
His research interest is in experimental solid state physics and materials, solar renewable energy and environmental sciences, and community engagement.

References

External links 
 Profile
 http://www.ises.org

Malaysian people of Malay descent
Alumni of Imperial College London
Living people
1952 births
Vice-chancellors of universities in Malaysia
People from Johor
Academic staff of the National University of Malaysia
Academic staff of Universiti Malaysia Sabah